G. B. Edwards may refer to:

Gerald Basil Edwards (1899–1976), British author
G. B. Edwards (arachnologist) (born 1948), American scientist

See also
Edwards (surname)